Elvis Bratanović (born 21 August 1992) is a Slovenian footballer who plays as a forward for FC Sursee.

Career
In 2014, he signed a four-year contract with the Czech First League side FK Teplice.

References

External links
NZS profile 

1992 births
Living people
Sportspeople from Celje
Slovenian footballers
Slovenia under-21 international footballers
Association football forwards
NK Rudar Velenje players
Slovenian expatriate footballers
Slovenian expatriate sportspeople in the Czech Republic
Slovenian expatriate sportspeople in Poland
Slovenian expatriate sportspeople in Switzerland
Expatriate footballers in the Czech Republic
Expatriate footballers in Poland
Expatriate footballers in Switzerland
FK Teplice players
Bohemians 1905 players
Bruk-Bet Termalica Nieciecza players
NK Domžale players
Neuchâtel Xamax FCS players
Ekstraklasa players
Slovenian PrvaLiga players
Slovenia youth international footballers